Baltimore is a small township situated on the N11 Highway in the Limpopo province of South Africa. It is a main stop-over for the Groblersbrug Border Post with Botswana.

Nature
The Wonderkop Nature Reserve is situated outside of town and preserves many native species, especially Sable antelope.

References

Populated places in the Blouberg Local Municipality